Mikhail Aleksandrovich Yershov (born 30 October 1986) is a former Russian professional football player.

Club career
He played two seasons in the Russian Football National League for FC Petrotrest St. Petersburg and FC Dynamo St. Petersburg.

External links
 
 

1986 births
People from Cherepovets
Living people
Russian footballers
Association football midfielders
FC Sheksna Cherepovets players
FC Tekstilshchik Ivanovo players
FC Petrotrest players
FC Dynamo Saint Petersburg players
FC Nizhny Novgorod (2015) players
Sportspeople from Vologda Oblast